This is the discography of Cantonese pop star, Joey Yung; seven-time winner of the IFPI Hong Kong Best Selling Female Singer of the Year award (2004–2006, 2008, 2011, 2013-2014).

Albums

Studio albums

Compilation albums

Note: Unlike other parts of the world, having an album reach platinum in sales is a noteworthy accomplishment even for the best selling artists. For the past decade, many of the years' top selling album were only certified double platinum (Qualifications: before 2005: Gold = 25,000, Platinum = 50,000; 
2005-2007: Gold = 20,000, Platinum = 40,000; after 2007: Gold = 15,000, Platinum = 30,000)
 The IFPI (HK) Music Awards was first established in 2001. In 2009, Hong Kong subsidiaries of the international Big Four record labels and BMA Records withdrew from IFPI (HK) and established the Hong Kong Recording Industry Alliance. Since then, the IFPI Music Awards accounts only for non-HKRIA artists.

Extended plays

Concert albums / karaoke
 Joey Yung Xia Shui Li Concert 2000 DVD/VCD (2000)
 Joey Yung Solemn on Stage Live in Concert 2001 CD/VCD/DVD (2002)
 Music Is Live 903 id Club Concert 2002 (2002)
 Love Joey II Karaoke DVD/VCD (2002)
 Joey Yung Live Show Up 2003 CD/VCD/DVD (2004)
 Joey All-Record VCD (2004)
 Joey Yung 'Feel the Pop' Concert Live 2004 CD/VCD/DVD (2004)
 Joey Yung X Hacken Lee The Music Is LIVE 903 Id Club Concert 2004CD/VCD/DVD (2005)
 Love:Joey:Love Karaoke VCD/DVD(2005)
 Let me believe love- Joey Yung X Jeff Chang 2005 CD/VCD/DVD (2005)
 Reflection of Joey's Live 2005 CD/VCD/DVD (2005)
 One Live One Love Concert 2006 CD/VCD/DVD (2006)
 Joey Yung X Leo Ku Juicy Lemon 2006 VCD/DVD (2007)
 Starlight Joey Yung Concert 08 3CD/3VCD/3DVD/4DVD/1Blu-ray Disc(BD) (2008)
 Joey Yung X Anthony Wong 2008 CD/VCD/DVD/Blu-ray Disc (BD) (2008)
 Perfect 10 Live 2009 + Joey Yung Documentary 3DVD+Album/2CD+3DVD+Album (2009)
 Metro Joey The Queen Live Karaoke (2009)
 Joey Yung Concert Number 6 Live 4DVD+Album/3CD+4DVD+Album (2010)
 Metro Joey & Joey Live 2DVD+2CD (2011)
 ageas Joey Yung in Concert 1314 3CD+Album/3DVD+Album (2014)

Singles

Promotional Singles

 * = 2 weeks #1

CD Singles

It is not common for Hong Kong singers to release commercial singles, which is why Joey has had only two CD singles despite having many promotional (radio/TV) singles, also known as "plugs" in Hong Kong popular music terminology.

References

 Discography
Yung, Joey
Pop music discographies